Piano Improvisations Vol. 2 is the eighth solo album by Chick Corea, recorded in April of 1971, and released in 1972. Recorded at the same sessions as his previous album, it similarly features Corea by himself on acoustic piano.

The album was released as an LP by the German label ECM. Along with its counterpart Piano Improvisations Vol. 1 (1971, ECM 1014), it  was recorded over the course of two days in Oslo, Norway. The two Piano Improvisations albums serve as a sort of bridge between Corea's largely free work in Circle and his more melodic Return to Forever music. In addition to seven original Corea compositions, he interprets his former Miles Davis bandmate Wayne Shorter's "Masqualero", and fellow pianist Thelonious Monk's "Trinkle, Tinkle".

On the back cover of the album Corea writes: "This music was created out of the desire to communicate and share the dream of a better life with people everywhere" (originally in uppercase).

Track listing 
All tracks composed by Chick Corea; except where indicated

Original album:
A. Side one
"After Noon Song" – 2:49
"Song for Lee Lee" – 2:41
"Song for Thad" – 2:00
"Trinkle, Tinkle" (Thelonious Monk) – 2:01
"Masqualero" (Wayne Shorter) – 5:32

B. Side two
"Preparation 1" – 2:37
"Preparation 2" – 0:52
"Departure from Planet Earth" – 7:36
"A New Place" 
 "Arrival" - 0:36
 "Scenery" - 5:49
 "Imps Walk" - 1:36
 "Rest" – 5:05

Personnel 
 Chick Corea – piano

 Manfred Eicher – producer
 Jan-Erik Kongshaug – engineer
 B. & B. Wojirsch – Cover design

Chart performance

References

External links 
 Chick Corea - Piano Improvisations Vol. 2 (1972) album review by Scott Yanow, credits & releases at AllMusic
 Chick Corea - Piano Improvisations Vol. 2 (1972) album releases & credits at Discogs
 Chick Corea - Piano Improvisations Vol. 2 (1972) album to be listened as stream on Spotify

1972 albums
Chick Corea albums
Albums produced by Manfred Eicher
ECM Records albums
Solo piano jazz albums